Zirikly (Yerekle) is a rural locality (a village) in Novokarmalinsky Selsoviet, Miyakinsky District, Bashkortostan, Russia. The population was 90 as of 2010. There are 2 streets.

Geography 
Zirikly is located 11 km northwest of Kirgiz-Miyaki (the district's administrative centre) by road. Andreyevka is the nearest rural locality.

References 

Rural localities in Miyakinsky District